Mike Tyson vs. Donovan Ruddock II, billed as The Rematch, was a professional boxing match contested on June 28, 1991. It was the second time the two fighters fought that year, as their first bout in March was mired in controversy.

The fight took place at the same venue the first one had, The Mirage in Paradise, Nevada, USA. As before, it was scheduled for twelve rounds and was a championship elimination fight with the winner becoming the mandatory top challenger for the undisputed world championship that was then held by Evander Holyfield.

Tyson would emerge victorious once again, this time defeating Ruddock by unanimous decision and solidifying his position as the number one contender.

Background

In the first fight between the two, controversy erupted in the seventh round. After Tyson hit Ruddock with a six-punch combination, referee Richard Steele stepped in and stopped the fight despite the fact the Ruddock had not been knocked down and appeared to be healthy enough to continue. This was the second time a Steele stoppage had caused controversy in twelve months. In the previous year, Steele served as referee for a world super lightweight title fight between Julio César Chávez and Meldrick Taylor. With the fight entering its final round, Taylor was winning on two judges’ scorecards but had taken a significant amount of physical punishment. Chavez eventually dropped Taylor in the final twenty seconds of the twelfth round, and even though Taylor made it to his feet, Steele called a halt to the contest two seconds shy of its completion after Taylor did not respond to him and Chavez won by technical knockout. 

After the fight was stopped, Ruddock's brother Delroy and his promoter Murad Muhammad got into a physical confrontation with Tyson's trainer Richie Giachetti while Steele had to be escorted to the back by Mirage security for his safety. Nine days after the fight, Tyson's promoter Don King and Muhammad struck a deal for a rematch to settle any controversy over the outcome of the initial bout. 

However, a decision by the Nevada Athletic Commission nearly resulted in the fight getting scuttled. After an investigation into the postfight brawl, Muhammad was handed a twelve-month suspension for his actions. Ruddock decided not to participate if Muhammad was not able to and thus he announced he would not take the fight. Nevertheless, Muhammad announced that the fight was back on 10 days later. 

Prior to the fight, the two men publicly expressed their dislike for one another. At a press conference before the fight, Tyson would infamously state that he would make Ruddock his "girlfriend".

Undercard
 Riddick Bowe (23–0, 20 KOs; IBF's #5, WBC and WBA's #7) knocked out  Rodolfo Marin (17–1, 14 KOs) with an overhand right hook in the 2nd round of the 10-rounds scheduled heavyweight bout, breaking Marin's jaw in the process. Referee Carlos Padilla counted Marin out at 1:45 of the 2nd rd.
 Azumah Nelson (33–2, 25 KOs; the defending WBC champion) held  Jeff Fenech (25–0, 19 KOs; WBC's #1) to a split draw in 12-rounds championship bout, retaining his WBC Super Featherweight title for the sixth time. Unpopular judges' decision was booed by the audience, as Fenech largely dominated the action.

The fight
In a hard fought match that went the distance, Tyson ultimately picked up the victory via unanimous decision with all three judges ruling in his favor with one score of 113–109 and two scores of 114–108. Tyson got off to a strong start in round 1. With 16 seconds left in the round, Tyson staggered Ruddock with a right hook to the side of his head, causing Ruddock to hold on to Tyson to prevent taking any more damage. After the bell rang, Tyson threw two punches at Ruddock, who in turn responded with a powerful right hand that just missed connecting with Tyson. Referee Mills Lane warned the two fighters between rounds that he would deduct points should punches be thrown after the bell. Tyson continued to attack Ruddock in round 2, hitting him with another strong right hand in the round's opening seconds. Later in the round, Tyson hit Ruddock with a 3-punch combination as Ruddock was against the ropes, though one of the punches was below the belt, causing Lane to separate the two and issue a warning to Tyson. After Lane's warning, Tyson hit Ruddock with a strong right overhand that knocked Ruddock to the canvas. Ruddock almost immediately got back up but was met with a furious onslaught from Tyson, who continued to hammer Ruddock with punches until fatigue set in with about 30 seconds left in the round.  Ruddock bounced back with a strong round 3, but in round 4, Tyson countered a Ruddock uppercut and landed a right hook that again sent Ruddock to canvas, though Ruddock was again able to quickly get back to his feet. Tyson also had the first of three points deducted in round 4 after once again landing a low blow on Ruddock. Tyson also lost points in both the 9th and 10th rounds for hitting Ruddock with another low blow and hitting him after the bell, while Ruddock lost a point in the 8th for hitting Tyson after the bell. In round 11, the two fighters exchanged low blows, but Lane opted not to deduct points, instead warning the two to "knock that shit off". In round 12, Tyson fought Ruddock aggressively in an attempt to gain the knockout victory, but Ruddock was able to withstand Tyson's attack and survive the fight without any further knockdowns. By the end of the fight, Ruddock's left eye had been swollen shut and his jaw had been broken, while Tyson suffered a perforated eardrum.

Aftermath
After months of tough negotiations between Tyson's and Evander Holyfield's respective camps, which included both men's promoters attempting to get a fight with George Foreman instead, a deal was reached that would see Holyfield and Tyson face each other for the Undisputed Heavyweight Championship on November 8, 1991 at Caesars Palace. However, Tyson suffered an injury during training camp and the fight was postponed.

Shortly after the agreement was struck for the Holyfield fight, Tyson was in Indianapolis for the Miss Black America pageant. There he met Desiree Washington, Miss Black Rhode Island; Washington would later accuse Tyson of raping her and he was arrested on that charge several weeks later. The case was tried beginning in January 1992 and Tyson was convicted on four counts of rape; he was sentenced to a maximum of ten years, four of which were suspended, in state prison and thus his boxing career was placed on an indefinite hiatus. 

Meanwhile, Ruddock would bounce back from his two losses to Tyson with knockout victories over Greg Page and Phil Jackson. This would set up a match with Lennox Lewis for the right to face the winner of the Evander Holyfield–Riddick Bowe fight for the Undisputed Heavyweight Championship. Ruddock would end up being knocked out by Lewis in the 2nd round, costing him a chance at the title and effectively ending his status as one of boxing's premier heavyweights.

References

1991 in boxing
Boxing in Las Vegas
1991 in sports in Nevada
Boxing on Showtime
Ruddock
June 1991 sports events in the United States